Konstantin Stoilov (23 September 1853 O.S. – 23 March 1901 O.S. ) was a leading Bulgarian politician and twice Prime Minister. Simeon Radev described him as the most European-like of all Bulgarian politicians.

Born in Plovdiv, Stoilov studied at Robert College in Istanbul, before studying law at Ruprecht Karl University of Heidelberg to doctorate level. Whilst in Germany he became a Freemason.

A career politician with the Conservative Party, and later his own People's Party, he held a number of government portfolios including Foreign Minister, Law Minister and Interior Affairs Minister, and Minister of Finance.  His first reign as Prime Minister lasted only for a brief spell in 1887. He returned in 1894 to preside over a longer ministry, which was characterized by increasing toleration for the activities of the Internal Macedonian Revolutionary Organization as well as fairer treatment of the Jews (as a lawyer, Stoilov had successfully defended the Jews of Vratsa from allegations of blood libel in 1890). Stoilov's government faced a campaign of criticism from sections of the press as organised by his main political opponent Stefan Stambolov and as a consequence the Stoilov administration enacted legislation against Stambolov, notably sequestering his land for state use and abolishing the pensions paid to former government ministers. The Stoilov-led coalition remained in office until 1899 when a series of liberal administrations began. He remained an important figure in Bulgarian politics until his death.

References

Further reading

External links

 

1853 births
1901 deaths
Politicians from Plovdiv
Conservative Party (Bulgaria) politicians
People's Party (Bulgaria) politicians
Prime Ministers of Bulgaria
Finance ministers of Bulgaria
Ambassadors of Bulgaria to Russia
Members of the Bulgarian Academy of Sciences
Members of the National Assembly (Bulgaria)
Robert College alumni
Heidelberg University alumni
19th-century Bulgarian people
Bulgarian Freemasons
Justice ministers of Bulgaria